Ambérieu or Ambérieux is the name or part of the name of several communes in France:

 Ambérieu-en-Bugey, in the Ain département
 Ambérieux, in the Rhône département
 Ambérieux-en-Dombes, in the Ain département